is a Japanese voice actor and singer who works for Intention. His big roles have included Yuuma Kousaka in  Gundam Build Fighters Try, Nagisa Kiryū in Classroom Crisis, Megumi Fushiguro in Jujutsu Kaisen, Eishirō Yabuki in The Asterisk War, Hayate Immelmann in Macross Delta, Ein Dalton in Mobile Suit Gundam: Iron-Blooded Orphans, Iori Kitahara in Grand Blue, Kyo Sohma in Fruits Basket, and Ash Lynx in Banana Fish, he is currently voicing Kawaki in Boruto: Naruto Next Generations. In 2017, he received the 11th Seiyu Awards for Best Male Newcomer with Setsuo Itō and Yusuke Kobayashi. In 2019, he won Best Male Lead Actor in the 13th Seiyu Awards. He made his singing debut in May 2018 under the King Records label. His older sister is voice actress Maaya Uchida.

Musical career 
Uchida made his solo debut in May 2018 under the record label, King Records, releasing his first solo single "New World"; it peaked at 9th place on the Oricon Weekly Singles Chart and stayed on the chart for 4 weeks.

On September 19, 2018, he released his 2nd single entitled "Before Dawn"; it peaked at 11th place on the Oricon Weekly Singles Chart and stayed on the chart for 3 weeks. Following the release, he made his first public live performance on September 24, 2018, in King Super Live 2018 held in Tokyo Dome wherein he sang "New World", and "Before Dawn"; he, with angela, Shouta Aoi, and Mamoru Miyano collaborated in singing "Kakumei Dualism" for the encore.

On May 8, 2019, he released his 3rd single "Speechless"; it peaked at 7th place on the Oricon Weekly Singles Chart and stayed on the chart for 2 weeks. The titular song from the single was used as the ending theme song for the anime, Kono Oto Tomare!.

On May 30, 2019; he announced on his Twitter that he celebrates his 1st anniversary as a solo artist by releasing his 1st album "HORIZON" on July 24, 2019, and will also hold his 1st live tour in 3 major cities across Japan starting October. He made his first television appearance as an artist on Ongaku no Hi 2019. His first album peaked at 7th place on the Oricon Albums Weekly Chart.

On November 27, 2019, he released his 4th single "Rainbow"; it peaked at 8th place on the Oricon Weekly Singles Chart and stayed on the chart for 2 weeks. The titular song from the single was used as the ending theme song for the anime, Kono Oto Tomare!.

On February 19, 2020, he released his 5th single "Over". The titular song from the single was used as the ending theme song for the anime, Ahiru no Sora.

Filmography

Anime

Films

Tokusatsu

Video games

2021
 Pokémon Masters EX as Emmet

Commercials 

 Room Aircon "Anata o Mi Mamoru Hen" (2019), Ga-kun
 Harry Potter: Wizards Unite (2019), Boy Protagonists (Japanese voice)
Ano Hi no Kokoro o Toraete (2019), Ryuto (voice)
【Piccoma】Hotto, Hitokoma (2020)

Dubbing

Discography

Singles

Album

Concerts

Personal Concerts

Other Concerts

Radio programs 

 Uchida Yuma's Change You Mind (内田雄馬のChange You Mind Uchida Yūma no Change You Mind) (2015)
BELOVED MEMORIES (with Atsushi Tamaru) (2015-2020)
 Uchida Yuma: Let Me Grill Your Stories (内田雄馬 君の話を焼かせて Uchida Yūma Kimi no Hanashi o Yakasete) (2017-2021)
Uchida Yuma: Heart Heat Hop (内田雄馬 Heart Heat Hop)

Publications

Photobooks 

 [2018.12.14] Uuuuma

Video 

 [2017.03.01] Uchida Yūma no Koe Meshi 1 (『内田雄馬のこえめし』第1)
 [2017.12.01] Uchida Yūma no Koe Meshi 2 (『内田雄馬のこえめし』第2)

References

External links
  
  
 

1992 births
Living people
Best Actor Seiyu Award winners
Dramatic Stars members
I'm Enterprise voice actors
Japanese male pop singers
Japanese male video game actors
Japanese male voice actors
Male voice actors from Tokyo
Seiyu Award winners
Singers from Tokyo
21st-century Japanese male actors
21st-century Japanese singers
21st-century Japanese male singers